ELL-associated factor 1 is a protein that, in humans, is encoded by the EAF1 gene. It is part of the EAF family of proteins.

References

Further reading